The Graph500 is a rating of supercomputer systems, focused on data-intensive loads. The project was announced on International Supercomputing Conference in June 2010. The first list was published at the ACM/IEEE Supercomputing Conference in November 2010. New versions of the list are published twice a year. The main performance metric used to rank the supercomputers is GTEPS (giga- traversed edges per second).

Richard Murphy from Sandia National Laboratories, says that "The Graph500's goal is to promote awareness of complex data problems", instead of focusing on computer benchmarks like HPL (High Performance Linpack), which TOP500 is based on.

Despite its name, there were several hundreds of systems in the rating, growing up to 174 in June 2014.

The algorithm and implementation that won the championship is published in the paper titled "Extreme scale breadth-first search on supercomputers".

There is also list Green Graph 500, which uses same performance metric, but sorts list according to performance per Watt, like Green 500 works with TOP500 (HPL).

Benchmark 
The benchmark used in Graph500 stresses the communication subsystem of the system, instead of counting double precision floating-point. It is based on a breadth-first search in a large undirected graph (a model of Kronecker graph with average degree of 16). There are three computation kernels in the benchmark: the first kernel is to generate the graph and compress it into sparse structures CSR or CSC (Compressed Sparse Row/Column); the second kernel does a parallel BFS search of some random vertices (64 search iterations per run); the third kernel runs a single-source shortest paths (SSSP) computation. Six possible sizes (Scales) of graph are defined: toy (226 vertices; 17 GB of RAM), mini (229; 137 GB), small (232; 1.1 TB), medium (236; 17.6 TB), large (239; 140 TB), and huge (242; 1.1 PB of RAM).

The reference implementation of the benchmark contains several versions:
 serial high-level in GNU Octave
 serial low-level in C
 parallel C version with usage of OpenMP
 two versions for Cray-XMT
 basic MPI version (with MPI-1 functions)
 optimized MPI version (with MPI-2 one-sided communications)
The implementation strategy that have won the championship on the Japanese K computer is described in.

Top 10 ranking

2022 
According to November 2022 release of the list:

2020 
Arm-based Fugaku took the top spot of the list.

2016 
According to June 2016 release of the list:

2014 
According to June 2014 release of the list:

2013 
According to June 2013 release of the list:

See also 
 TOP500
 Green500
 HPCG benchmark

References

External links
 
 June 2014  Graph 500
 Introducing the Graph 500, paper by Sandia

Supercomputer benchmarks
Top lists